NGC 6325 is a globular cluster located in the constellation Ophiuchus. Its Shapley-Sawyer Concentration Class is IV, meaning that it has "intermediate rich concentration"; it was discovered by the British astronomer John Herschel on 24 May 1835. It is at a distance of about 25,000 light years away from Earth.

See also 
 List of NGC objects (6001–7000)
 List of NGC objects

References

External links 
 

Globular clusters
6325
Ophiuchus (constellation)